Dresser is a surname. Notable people with the surname include:
 Annetta Seabury Dresser (1843–1935), American writer
 Bob Dresser (1878–1924), American baseball player
 Christopher Dresser (1834–1904), Scottish designer and design theorist, a pivotal figure in the Aesthetic Movement
 Daniel LeRoy Dresser (1862–1915), American shipbuilder
 Davis Dresser
 Denise Dresser (born 1963), Mexican political analyst, writer, and university professor
 Edith Stuyvesant Dresser (1873–1958), American philanthropist and wife of George Washington Vanderbilt II and Peter Goelet Gerry
 George Warren Dresser (1837–1883), American soldier and civil engineer
 Henry Dresser (1891–1963), American football and baseball player and coach.
 Henry Eeles Dresser (1838–1915), English businessman and ornithologist
 Hilary Dresser (born 1968), British sprint canoeist
 Horatio Dresser (1866–1954), American, New Thought religious leader and author
 Ivan Dresser (1896–1956), American runner in the 1920 Olympics
 Jeff Dresser (born 1973), retired American soccer midfielder
 Julius Dresser (1838–1893), American, early leader in the New Thought movement
 Kevin Dresser (born 1962), American wrestling coach
 Louisa Dresser (1907–1989), expert on early American painting
 Louise Dresser (1878–1965), American actress
 Madge Dresser, professor
 Marcia Van Dresser (1877–1937), American operatic soprano, recitalist, and actress
 Mark Dresser (born 1952), American double bass player and composer
 Paul Dresser (1857–1906), American singer, songwriter and comedic actor
 Richard Dresser (born c.1951), American playwright
 Samuel Dresser (1831–1901), American politician
 Solomon Robert Dresser (1842–1911), American inventor and politician
 Tom Dresser (1892–1982), English soldier, recipient of the Victoria Cross